Panchpara is a census town in Sankrail CD Block of Howrah Sadar subdivision in Howrah district in the Indian state of West Bengal. It is a part of Kolkata Urban Agglomeration.

Geography

Demographics
As per 2011 Census of India Panchpara had a total population of 19,283 of which 9,976 (52%) were males and 9,307 (48%) were females. Population below 6 years was 2,415. The total number of literates in Panchpara was 14,127 (83.75% of the population over 6 years).

Panchpara was part of Kolkata Urban Agglomeration in 2011 census.

 India census, Panchpara had a population of 15,078. Males constitute 52% of the population and females 48%. Panchpara has an average literacy rate of 71%, higher than the national average of 59.5%: male literacy is 74% and female literacy is 67%. In Panchpara, 14% of the population is under 6 years of age.

Transport
Satyen Bose Road is the artery of the town.

Bus

Private Bus
 69 Sankrail railway station - Howrah Station

Mini Bus
 24 Sankrail railway station - Howrah Station

Bus Routes Without Numbers
 Sankrail railway station - New Town Shapoorji Housing Estate
 Sarenga (Kolatala More) - New Town Unitech

Train
Mourigram railway station on Howrah-Kharagpur line is the nearest railway station.

References

Cities and towns in Howrah district
Neighbourhoods in Kolkata
Kolkata Metropolitan Area